Charles H. Clements (born August 21, 1943) is a Republican member of the West Virginia Senate, representing the 2nd district since January 28, 2017. Prior to this, Clements represented the 5th District in the West Virginia House of Delegates from 1995 to 1998.

Election results

References

External links 
 Official page at the West Virginia Legislature

 
 Vote Smart page
 Ballotpedia page

1943 births
Living people
People from New Martinsville, West Virginia
Politicians from Huntington, West Virginia
Republican Party West Virginia state senators
Republican Party members of the West Virginia House of Delegates
Businesspeople from West Virginia
West Virginia University alumni
Methodists from West Virginia
United States Army soldiers
20th-century American politicians
21st-century American politicians